In the mathematical theory of dynamical systems, an isochron is a set of initial conditions for the system that all lead to the same long-term behaviour.

Mathematical isochron

An introductory example

Consider the ordinary differential equation for a solution  evolving in time:

This ordinary differential equation (ODE) needs two initial conditions at, say, time . The following argument shows that the isochrons for this system are here the straight lines .

The general solution of the above ODE is

Now, as time increases, the exponential terms decays very quickly to zero (exponential decay). Thus all solutions of the ODE quickly approach .  That is, all solutions with the same  have the same long term evolution.  The exponential decay of the  term brings together a host of solutions to share the same long term evolution.  Find the isochrons by answering which initial conditions have the same .

Algebraically eliminate the immaterial constant  from these two equations to deduce that all initial conditions  have the same , hence the same long term evolution, and hence form an isochron.

Accurate forecasting requires isochrons

Let's turn to a more interesting application of the notion of isochrons.  Isochrons arise when trying to forecast predictions from models of dynamical systems.  Consider the toy system of two coupled ordinary differential equations

A marvellous mathematical trick is the normal form (mathematics) transformation.  Here the coordinate transformation near the origin

to new variables  transforms the dynamics to the separated form

So the long term evolution is determined solely by : the  equation is the model.  

Let us use the  equation to predict the future. Given some initial values  of the original variables: what initial value should we use for ? Answer: the  that has the same long term evolution. So all initial conditions with the same , but different , have the same long term evolution. Fix  and vary  gives the curving isochrons in the  plane. For example, very near the origin the isochrons of the above system are approximately the lines .

You may find such normal form transformations for relatively simple systems of ordinary differential equations, both deterministic and stochastic, via an interactive web site.

References

Dynamical systems